Stempfferia francisci, the brown epitola, is a butterfly in the family Lycaenidae. It is found in Nigeria. The habitat consists of forests.

References

Butterflies described in 1999
Poritiinae
Endemic fauna of Nigeria
Butterflies of Africa